Dalbergia capuronii is a species of legume in the family Fabaceae.

It is found only in Madagascar. It is threatened by habitat loss.

The Latin specific epithet of capuronii is in honor of the French botanist René Capuron. It was first published in Bull. Mus. Natl. Hist. Nat., B, Adansonia Vol.18 on page 176 in 1996.

References

capuronii
Endemic flora of Madagascar
Endangered plants
Taxonomy articles created by Polbot
Plants described in 1996